The 2016 Cash Converters Players Championship Finals was the ninth edition of the PDC darts tournament, the Players Championship Finals, which saw the top 64 players from the 20 Players Championship events of 2016 taking part, doubling the number of participants. The tournament took place at Butlin's Minehead in Minehead, England, between 25–27 November 2016.

Sixteen time world champion Phil Taylor was a notable absence at the tournament after failing to qualify, having played only three out of the 20 tournaments during the year.

Michael van Gerwen was the defending champion by beating Adrian Lewis 11–6 in the previous year's final, and van Gerwen would retain his Players Championship title, beating Dave Chisnall 11–3 in the final.

Alan Norris hit a nine-dart finish in his first-round match against Michael Smith, which was the first time it had ever happened in the tournament's history.

Prize money
The 2016 Players Championship Finals will have a total prize fund of £400,000, a £100,000 increase since the previous staging of the tournament. The following is the breakdown of the fund:

Qualification
The 2016 tournament will see a change in terms of qualification. The top 64 players from the Players Championships Order of Merit, which is solely based on prize money won in the twenty Players Championships events during the season, will qualify for the tournament.

These are the qualifiers after the 20 events: On 21 November, it was announced that the #23 seed Kyle Anderson was forced to withdraw, owing to problems with his visa, so all the players below him moved up one ranking place, with Andy Hamilton moving into the #64 slot.

Top 64 in the Players Championship Order of Merit

Draw
There was no draw held, but all players were put in a fixed bracket by their seeding positions.

Finals

Top half

Section 1

Section 2

Bottom half

Section 3

Section 4

References

Players Championship Finals
2016 in darts
2016 in English sport
Minehead
Sports competitions in Somerset
2010s in Somerset